Małgorzata Buczkowska (born 25 August 1976, in Lublin)  is a Polish film and stage actress, best known outside Poland for her leading role in Zasada przyjemnosci. (The Principle of Pleasure, Géométrie de la mort, etc.)

She was awarded the Zlota Maska (Golden Mask) award several times (2004, 2005, 2007), twice nominated for the Zbyszek Cybulski Award (2008, 2009), and had a number of other distinctions.

References

Living people
Polish film actresses
Polish stage actresses
21st-century Polish actresses
1976 births